The Renaissance Riverview Plaza Hotel, formerly known as the Adam's Mark Hotel, is a high-rise hotel in the U.S. city of Mobile, Alabama. Completed in 1983, the building rises  and 28 stories. The Renaissance Riverview Plaza Hotel is the second-tallest building and largest hotel in Mobile and the tallest hotel in the state of Alabama.

The building later fell to fourth-tallest upon the 1994 completion of the  City-County Administration Building. The building underwent a $5 million renovation (USD) in 2002, and in 2008 a large spire was constructed over the existing structure. The spire was designed to complement the spire of the RSA Battle House Tower; in shape and design, the two structures are nearly identical.

See also 
 List of tallest buildings in Mobile, Alabama

References

Skyscrapers in Mobile, Alabama
Hotels in Mobile, Alabama
Hotel buildings completed in 1983
Hotels established in 1983
Skyscraper hotels in Alabama
1983 establishments in Alabama